Magasin may refer to:

Magasin du Nord, today branded as Magasin, a Danish department store brand
Le Magasin, Centre National d'Art Contemporain, an art exhibit founded in 1986
"Magasin" (song), a 1994 song by Eraserheads

See also
 Magazine (disambiguation)